William Lochead FRSE MWS (sometimes given as Lochhead; c.1753-1815) was a Scottish surgeon and botanist. He served as the curator of the St Vincent Botanical Garden in the West Indies from 1811 to 1815, succeeding his friend Alexander Anderson.

Life

The son of John Lochead, William was born in Paisley in central Scotland around 1753. He graduated MD from the University of Glasgow in 1775 and served as a surgeon in Antigua in the West Indies.

In 1791 he was elected a Fellow of the Royal Society of Edinburgh. His proposers were John Walker, William Wright and Daniel Rutherford.

In 1794 he wrote extensively to Rev Dr John Walker concerning Guiana and the island of Demerara.

He died at St Vincent on 22 March 1815. His post in the Gardens was succeeded by George Caley.

References

Scottish botanists
Scottish surgeons
1750s births
1815 deaths
People from Paisley, Renfrewshire
Alumni of the University of Glasgow
Fellows of the Royal Society of Edinburgh
18th-century British botanists
18th-century Scottish scientists
19th-century British botanists
18th-century Scottish medical doctors
19th-century Scottish medical doctors